Recharger may refer to:
 Battery charger 
 AC adapter
 "Recharger" (song), a song by Fear Factory from The Industrialist